James Njiru (died 26 June 2013) was a politician from Kirinyaga County in the Republic of Kenya. He served in president Jomo Kenyatta's government as an assistant minister of Health, in president Daniel Moi's Government as a cabinet Minister in the docket of National Guidance and Political Affairs as well as the Ministry of Culture and Social Services. He was as a Member of Kirinyaga Parliament for many years.

Death
Njiru died of cancer on 26 June 2013.

Family
He was husband to Jane Wangeci Njiru and the father to Ken Njiru, Stephen Njiru, Irene Njiru, Richard Mwangi Njiru, Ann Njiru, Jacqueline Njiru, and Daniel Njiru.

References

2013 deaths
Kenyan politicians
Deaths from cancer in Kenya
Year of birth missing